Transformation of the Roman World was a 5-year scientific programme, during the years 1992 to 1997, founded via the European Science Foundation.
The research project was to investigate the societal transformation taking place in Europe in the period between Late Antiquity up to the time of the Carolingian dynasty.
The results were presented in museal exhibitions and as well published in a book series carrying the same name as the project.
Contributors to the series include Walter Pohl, Richard Hodges, Bryan Ward-Perkins, Ian Wood, Mayke de Jong, Janet Nelson, Chris Wickham, Miquel Barceló, Hans-Werner Goetz, and Jörg Jarnut.

The Brill's series "Transformation of the Roman World"
 
 
 
 
 
 
 Missing

See also
 Ancient history
 Classical antiquity
 Late antiquity
 Early Middle Ages

Literature

External links
 Brill´s Series on the Transformation of the Roman World
 Brill´s Series on the Early Middle Ages, presented as continuating the Transformation of the Roman World-book-series.

Late antiquity
Medieval studies
Science events